Duncan Finlayson (September 12, 1867 – September 25, 1925) was a Canadian lawyer, judge, and politician.
Born in Grand River, Nova Scotia, the son of Donald and Annabella (Murchison) Finlayson, Finlayson was educated at the Sydney Academy and Dalhousie University where he received a Bachelor of Arts degree in 1893 and a Bachelor of Laws degree in 1895. He was solicitor of the municipality of Richmond, Nova Scotia from 1896 to 1904. He sat in the Nova Scotia House of Assembly from 1897 to 1904. He was very passionate about law and wished to be a lawyer for no other reason than justice.

He was first elected to the House of Commons of Canada for the electoral district of Richmond in the general elections of 1904. A Liberal, he did not stand for re-election. In 1908, he was appointed judge of the County Court, District No. 7 and was appointed surrogate judge in Admiralty for the Island of Cape Breton in 1911.

References
 
 The Canadian Parliament; biographical sketches and photo-engravures of the senators and members of the House of Commons of Canada. Being the tenth Parliament, elected November 3, 1904
 History of Nova Scotia (Volume 3) (1916)

1867 births
1925 deaths
Dalhousie University alumni
Schulich School of Law alumni
Liberal Party of Canada MPs
Members of the House of Commons of Canada from Nova Scotia
Judges in Nova Scotia
Nova Scotia Liberal Party MLAs